Carlton Brandaga Curtis (December 17, 1811 – March 17, 1883) was an American politician from Pennsylvania who served as a Democratic member of the U.S. House of Representatives for Pennsylvania's 23rd congressional district from 1851 to 1853 and the 24th district from 1853 to 1855. He then switched parties and later served again as a Republican member for the 19th district from 1873 to 1875.

Early life
Carlton B. Curtis was born in Madison County, New York. He moved to Mayville, New York, and studied law. He moved to Erie, Pennsylvania, where he continued the study of law. He was admitted to the bar in 1834. He moved to Warren, Pennsylvania, in 1834 and commenced practice. He was a member of the Pennsylvania State House of Representatives from 1836 to 1838.

First election to Congress
Curtis was elected as a Democrat to the Thirty-second and Thirty-third Congresses. He served as chairman of the United States House Committee on Accounts during the Thirty-third Congress. He was affiliated with the Republican Party in 1855.

Civil War service
Curtis entered the Union Army on February 13, 1862, as lieutenant colonel of the Fifty-eighth Regiment, Pennsylvania Volunteer Infantry for a period of three years. He was promoted to colonel of that regiment on May 23, 1863. Because of illness was honorably discharged as colonel on July 2.

Post war activities
He returned to Warren and practiced law. In 1868 he moved to Erie, Pennsylvania, and continued the practice of law. He was also interested in banking and the production of oil, and was one of the originators and builders of the Dunkirk & Venango Railroad.

Curtis was again elected as a Republican to the Forty-third Congress. He was an unsuccessful candidate for reelection in 1874. He resumed the practice of law, and died in Erie in 1883. Interment in Oakland Cemetery in Warren, Pennsylvania.

See also
List of United States representatives from Pennsylvania

Footnotes

References
 Retrieved on February 14, 2008
The Political Graveyard

Members of the Pennsylvania House of Representatives
Union Army officers
Pennsylvania lawyers
People from Madison County, New York
Politicians from Erie, Pennsylvania
People from Warren County, Pennsylvania
1811 births
1883 deaths
Burials in Pennsylvania
People of Pennsylvania in the American Civil War
Republican Party members of the United States House of Representatives from Pennsylvania
Democratic Party members of the United States House of Representatives from Pennsylvania
People from Mayville, New York
19th-century American politicians
19th-century American lawyers